Why the Wait is an EP released by the pop-rock band Ingram Hill on October 31, 2006.

Track listing
"Firefly Ride"  
"Love is Just a Word"  
"Why the Wait (demo)"  
"Solsbury Hill"
"Call It My Way"

Personnel
Justin Moore - Lead vocals, Rhythm guitar 
Matt Chambless - Drums
Shea Sowell - Bass, backing vocals
Phil Bogard - Lead Guitar

References

2006 EPs
Ingram Hill albums